The November 2009 Peshawar attacks was a bombing that happened on 19 November 2009. The bombings happened outside a court building during the morning, the blast occurred near the main entrance of the judicial complex.
People have reported that the blast occurred in a car parked adjacent to the building, however many unconfirmed reports said it was a suicide attack. At least ten people were killed and nearly 50 others were injured during the blast. The 50 injured people were brought to the Lady Reading Hospital and four of them were listed as being in serious condition.

See also
List of terrorist incidents, 2009

References

21st-century mass murder in Pakistan
Mass murder in 2009
Car and truck bombings in Pakistan
Terrorist incidents in Pakistan in 2009
Terrorist incidents in Peshawar
Attacks on buildings and structures in Pakistan
Building bombings in Pakistan